Winifred Margaret Ewing  ( Woodburn; born 10 July 1929) is a Scottish politician, lawyer and figure within the independence movement who served as President of the Scottish National Party from 1987 to 2005. Ewing was a Member of the Scottish Parliament (MSP) for Highlands and Islands from 1999 to 2003 and a Member of the European Parliament (MEP) for the equivalent seat from 1979 to 1999. She was also a member of the British House of Commons for Hamilton from a 1967 by-election until 1970, and for Moray and Nairn from 1974 to 1979.

Born and raised in Glasgow, Ewing studied law at the University of Glasgow, where she joined the university's Scottish Nationalist Association. After graduating, she worked as a lawyer, serving as Secretary of the Glasgow Bar Association from 1962 to 1967. Ewing was elected to the House of Commons in the 1967 Hamilton by-election and her presence at Westminster led to a rise in membership for the SNP, from her quote; "stop the world, Scotland wants to get on". Although she lost her seat in the 1970 UK election, she was re-elected in February 1974, this time for the Moray and Nairn constituency. Ewing lost her seat in the 1979 election and, after making numerous attempts to seek re-election, she failed to do so.

Ewing was elected to the European Parliament in the 1979 elections, representing the Highlands and Islands. In the parliament, she acquired the nickname  (French for 'Mrs Scotland') because of her advocacy of Scottish interests at Brussels. In 1987, she became the President of the Scottish National Party, succeeding Ian Hudghton. She served as Vice President of the European Radical Alliance and by 1995 had become Britain's longest serving MEP. In the first elections to the Scottish Parliament, she was elected to serve as an MSP for Highlands and Islands. As the oldest qualified member, it was her duty to preside over the opening of the Scottish Parliament.

Early life
Ewing was born in July 1929 in Glasgow to Christina Bell Anderson and George Woodburn, a small business owner. She was educated at Battlefield School and Queen's Park Secondary School. In 1946 she matriculated at the University of Glasgow where she graduated with an MA and LLB. Although relatively inactive in politics at that time, she joined the Student Nationalists. Following her graduation, she qualified and practised as a solicitor and notary public. She was Secretary of the Glasgow Bar Association from 1962 to 1967.

Political career 
Ewing became active in campaigning for Scottish independence through her membership of the Glasgow University Scottish Nationalist Association, and won the 1967 Hamilton by-election as the Scottish National Party (SNP) candidate. She was elected with the help of a team including her election agent, John McAteer. On 16 November, she made her first appearance at Westminster, with her husband and children accompanying her on the journey. She arrived at the parliament in a Scottish-built Hillman Imp and was greeted by a crowd and a pipe band.

Ewing said at the time "stop the world, Scotland wants to get on", and her presence at Westminster led to a rise in membership for the SNP. It was speculated that Ewing's electoral gain led to the establishment of the Kilbrandon Commission by the Labour government of Harold Wilson to look into the viability of a devolved Scottish Assembly. In hindsight it could be said to mark the start of modern politics in Scotland, according to Professor Richard Finlay, Strathclyde University, bringing young people and women from non-political backgrounds into politics for the first time, whilst Labour and Tory party organisation and branch numbers were declining.

Despite her high profile, Ewing was unsuccessful in retaining the Hamilton seat at the 1970 general election. At the following February 1974 election she stood for Moray and Nairn and was returned to Westminster, although another election followed in October of the same year when her already marginal majority declined. Following the October election she was announced as the SNP's spokesperson on external affairs and EEC. She first became an MEP in 1975, at a time when the European Parliament was still composed of representative delegations from national parliaments. She lost her Westminster seat at the May 1979 election, but within weeks had gained a seat in the European Parliament at the first direct elections to the Parliament. Ewing was unsuccessful at seeking to return to Westminster as the SNP candidate for Orkney and Shetland in 1983, coming third.

She was elected the SNP Party President in 1987. It was during her time as an MEP that she acquired the nickname  (French for 'Mrs Scotland') because of her advocacy of Scottish interests in Strasbourg and Brussels. That sobriquet was first used by Le Monde and with Ewing using the term as a badge of pride, it stuck. By 1995 she had become Britain's longest serving MEP. She had been a former Vice President of the European Radical Alliance which included French, Guyanese, Flemish, Luxembourg, Italian, Corsican and Spanish (Canary Islands) MEPs.

In 1999, she did not stand for the European Parliament, instead becoming a Member of the Scottish Parliament (MSP) in the first session of the Scottish Parliament, representing the Highlands and Islands. As the oldest qualified member, it was her duty to preside over the opening of the Scottish Parliament, a session she opened with the statement: "The Scottish Parliament, adjourned on the 25th day of March in the year 1707, is hereby reconvened". She sat as a member on the European Committee, then the Public Petitions Committee.

During the controversy that arose in the early years of the Scottish Parliament surrounding proposals to repeal Clause 28 (a law banning the active promotion of homosexuality in schools), she joined her son Fergus Ewing in abstaining, although her daughter in law Margaret Ewing supported repeal as did the majority of her party's MSPs. In June 2001, having turned 72 years old, she announced that she would retire from Parliament at the end of the session. In January 2003, her husband, Stewart Ewing, died in a fire accident. He had been active with her in politics for many years, and had himself served as an SNP councillor for the Summerston area in Glasgow, gaining the seat of Dick Dynes, the leader of the Labour Group on Glasgow District Council in 1977, a result described by The Glasgow Herald as "an absolute sensation". Later in 2003 she stood down from being an MSP, although she continued to serve as the SNP's President, a position she held for many years.

On 15 July 2005, she announced she would be stepping down as President of the Scottish National Party at its September Conference, bringing to an end her 38-year career in representative politics. Her son Fergus Ewing serves as SNP MSP, as did his wife Margaret Ewing, and her daughter Annabelle Ewing, who was also an MP between 2001 and 2005.

First Minister of Scotland, Nicola Sturgeon said that Ewing had given her "hugely valuable advice" on public speaking, and that Ewing had given her some important advice as a young woman in politics, namely "Stand your ground and believe in yourself" and "a more vibrant, colourful, dynamic, passionate, committed person, you would struggle to meet."

Outside Parliament
Ewing is a vice president of equal rights charity Parity. On April 2009, BBC Alba broadcast a biographical documentary Madame Ecosse, produced by Madmac Productions. It was rebroadcast on BBC Scotland  to mark her 80th birthday. Nicola Sturgeon named Ewing as her Political Hero on BBC News in 2018.

Awards and honours
In 1990 she was made a fellow of the Royal Society of Arts. She was conferred with honorary LLD degrees from the University of Glasgow in 1995 and University of Aberdeen in 2004, She was conferred with Doctor of the University degrees from the Open University in 1993 and University of Stirling in 2012. In 2009, a portrait of her painted by David Donaldson in 1970 was loaned to the Scottish Parliament and put on display.

References

Further reading

External links
 

Mother Scotland (22 February 2007 ) The Scotsman
Portrait of Winnie Ewing, by Norman Edgar, at the Scottish National Portrait Gallery

1929 births
Living people
Alumni of the University of Glasgow
Female members of the Parliament of the United Kingdom for Scottish constituencies
Members of the Parliament of the United Kingdom for Highland constituencies
Members of the Scottish Parliament 1999–2003
MEPs for the United Kingdom 1973–1979
MEPs for Scotland 1979–1984
MEPs for Scotland 1984–1989
MEPs for Scotland 1989–1994
MEPs for Scotland 1994–1999
20th-century women MEPs for Scotland
21st-century women MEPs for Scotland
Politicians from Glasgow
Politics of Moray
Presidents of the Scottish National Party
Scottish autobiographers
Lawyers from Glasgow
Scottish National Party MEPs
Scottish National Party MSPs
Scottish National Party MPs
UK MPs 1966–1970
UK MPs 1974
UK MPs 1974–1979
Female members of the Scottish Parliament
Scottish women lawyers
20th-century Scottish lawyers
Women autobiographers
People educated at Queen's Park Secondary School
20th-century women lawyers